The 1st César Awards ceremony, presented by the Académie des Arts et Techniques du Cinéma, honoured the best French films of 1975 and took place on 3 April 1976 at the Palais des congrès in Paris. The ceremony was chaired by Jean Gabin and hosted by Pierre Tchernia. Le Vieux Fusil won the award for Best Film.

Winners and nominees
The winners are denoted in bold.

See also
 48th Academy Awards
 29th British Academy Film Awards

References

External links
 Official website
 
 1st César Awards at AlloCiné

1976
Cesar
1976 film awards